Dennis Thorbourne (1927 – 9 March 1967) was a Jamaican cricketer. He played in ten first-class matches for the Jamaican cricket team from 1949 to 1959.

See also
 List of Jamaican representative cricketers

References

External links
 

1927 births
1967 deaths
Jamaican cricketers
Jamaica cricketers
People from Saint Ann Parish